Flying Regiment 2 ( or LentoR 2, renamed on May 5, 1942 into LeR 2) was fighter regiment of the Finnish Air Force during World War II.

Organization

Winter War
No. 22 Squadron: fighter squadron
No. 24 Squadron: fighter squadron
No. 26 Squadron: fighter squadron
No. 28 Squadron: fighter squadron

Continuation War
HQ
HQ Company
No. 16 Squadron: reconnaissance squadron, attached to LeR 2 on May 6, 1942.
No. 12 Squadron: fighter squadron
No. 26 Squadron: fighter squadron
No. 28 Squadron: fighter squadron
No. 25 Supplement Squadron

Maintenance companies
3rd Airfield Company (3. Lentokenttäkomppania or 3.Le.KenttäK)
4th Airfield Company (4. Lentokenttäkomppania or 4.Le.KenttäK)

Lapland War
No. 14 Squadron: fighter squadron
No. 26 Squadron: fighter squadron
No. 28 Squadron: fighter squadron

The equipment consisted among others of Fokker D.XXIs, Morane-Saulnier MS.406s,  Brewster Buffaloes, Messerschmitt Bf 109Gs, Bristol Bulldog Mk.IVs, Fiat G.50s, Hawker Hurricane Mk.Is, Gloster Gladiator Mk.IIs, Polikarpov I-153s,  Mörkö-Moranes, Fokker C.Xs, and Westland Lysander Mk.Is.

Bibliography

External links
Lentorykmentti 2 1941

Regiments of the Finnish Air Force
Military units and formations of Finland in the Winter War
Continuation War